José Adoni Cifuentes Charcopa (born 12 March 1999) is an Ecuadorian professional footballer who plays as a midfielder for Major League Soccer club Los Angeles FC and the Ecuador national team.

Club career
In January 2020, Cifuentes joined Major League Soccer side Los Angeles FC for a reported fee of $3 million, signing a four-year contract.

International career
Cifuentes represented the Ecuadorian under-20 team at the 2019 South American U-20 Championship, which Ecuador won, and the 2019 FIFA U-20 World Cup, where Ecuador finished third. In the latter tournament Cifuentes scored the opening goal in a 2-1 victory over the United States.

He made his senior debut for Ecuador on 6 September 2019 in a match against Peru.

Career statistics

Club

Honours
Los Angeles FC
MLS Cup: 2022
Supporters' Shield: 2022

References

1999 births
Living people
Ecuadorian footballers
Ecuador under-20 international footballers
Ecuador international footballers
C.D. Universidad Católica del Ecuador footballers
Ecuadorian Serie A players
Sportspeople from Esmeraldas, Ecuador
Association football defenders
Los Angeles FC players
Major League Soccer players
2022 FIFA World Cup players